Theo van der Leeuw (born 9 April 1949) is a Dutch former road cyclist. He competed in the 1973 Tour de France, where he finished 70th overall. That same year he participated in the World Road Race Championships, but was unable to finish.

Major results
1972
 1st Stage 7 Olympia's Tour
1973
 3rd Grote Prijs Jef Scherens
1974
 3rd Circuit des Frontières
 8th Druivenkoers-Overijse
 8th Le Samyn

References

1949 births
Living people
Dutch male cyclists